Marquis of Lanling may refer to:

Wang Lang (Cao Wei) (died 228), Cao Wei politician
Wang Su (Cao Wei) (195–256), Cao Wei politician and Wang Lang's son